The  is a complex consisting of two halls and an exhibition room, located in Chūō-ku, Osaka, Japan. The complex was opened in 1984 as the fourth national theatre of the country, to become the headquarters of bunraku.

History
The Japan Arts Council, an Independent Administrative Institution of the Ministry of Education, Culture, Sports, Science and Technology, operates the National Theatre.

Outline
The theatre has two halls. The Large Theatre has a capacity of around 700 seats depending on stage setup, and is primarily used for performances of bunraku, as well as Buyō and stage plays. In the Small Hall are performed other type of traditional arts such as, rakugo, manzai and Japanese music.

External links
 
 National Theatre of Japan official web site

References 

Arts centres in Japan
Buildings and structures in Osaka
Chūō-ku, Osaka
Kisho Kurokawa buildings
Tourist attractions in Osaka
Bunraku
Culture in Osaka
Theatres in Japan
Theatres completed in 1984
1984 establishments in Japan